True Tone Records was a United States based record label producing 78 disc records of Dixieland jazz in the 1950s. The label was headquartered in New Orleans, Louisiana.

See also
 List of record labels

Defunct record labels of the United States